Jesse Langford Montgomery (July 29, 1904 – November 15, 1976) was an American middle-distance runner. He competed in the men's 3000 metres steeplechase at the 1928 Summer Olympics.

References

External links
 

1904 births
1976 deaths
Athletes (track and field) at the 1928 Summer Olympics
American male middle-distance runners
American male steeplechase runners
Olympic track and field athletes of the United States
Place of birth missing